Picton Airport  is located on the southeast side of Picton, Ontario, Canada, near the Bay of Quinte on Lake Ontario. The airport is used for general aviation, including glider flying. The runway is also used for competitive, amateur automobile racing events such as arm-drop drag races and autocross with the St Lawrence Automobile Club.

History
During World War II, the airport hosted the No. 31 Bombing and Gunnery School for the British Commonwealth Air Training Plan, operating Avro Anson, Fairey Battle, Bristol Bolingbroke, and Westland Lysander aircraft. In 1953, the Prince Edward Flying club took over operation of the airport. The airport was known as CFB Picton. The airport has been owned by Loch-Sloy Holdings Limited since 1970. During the summer it is home to the Air Cadet Gliding Program along with CFB Mountainview. It is also used for motor-sport events such as autoslalom by the St. Lawrence Automobile Club. There are also regular "Armdrop" drag racing events and tractor pulls were held here as well in 2010 and 2011. In 2005, the base served as the Driver Rehabilitation Centre for Canada's Worst Driver.

See also

 List of British Commonwealth Air Training Plan facilities in Canada

References

External links
 Page about this airport on COPA's Places to Fly airport directory

Registered aerodromes in Ontario
Airports of the British Commonwealth Air Training Plan